Snobs is a surviving 1915 American comedy silent film directed by Oscar Apfel, written by George Bronson Howard, and starring Victor Moore, Anita King, Ernest Joy, Constance Johnson and Florence Dagmar. It was released on April 12, 1915, by Paramount Pictures. The film was Moore's feature film debut.

Plot
How Henry, the milkman, is treated by the snobs after he inherits $20m.

Cast  
Victor Moore as Henry Disney
Anita King as Ethel Hamilton
Ernest Joy as Mr. Phipps
Constance Johnson as Laura Phipps
Florence Dagmar		
Jode Mullally

Preservation status
Formerly thought lost, a copy is held in the Library of Congress collection Packard.

References

External links 
 
 

1915 films
1910s English-language films
Silent American comedy films
1915 comedy films
Paramount Pictures films
Films directed by Oscar Apfel
American black-and-white films
American silent feature films
1910s rediscovered films
Rediscovered American films
1910s American films